Dhanshiri is a river in the Jhalokati District of Bangladesh. It is narrower than it once was.

Significance

Local lore has it that poet Jibanananda Das had a maternal uncle in Bamankathi village(in today's Rajapur Upazila), and during his childhood visits there, he  fell in love with the natural beauty of the Dhanshiri River. He wrote of it poignantly in his poem "Ābāra āsiba phirē" (I will come back again):

References

Rivers of Bangladesh
Rivers of Barisal Division